Mariaba is a genus of moths in the family Geometridae first described by Francis Walker in 1866.

Species
Mariaba convoluta Walker, 1866
Mariaba semifascia (Warren, 1903)

References

External links

Eupitheciini